The 1992 Scheldeprijs was the 79th edition of the Scheldeprijs cycle race and was held on 22 April 1992. The race was won by Wilfried Nelissen.

General classification

References

1992
1992 in road cycling
1992 in Belgian sport